Eric Agyemang (born 11 January 1980) is a German former professional footballer who played as a forward.

Career
Agyemang was born in Obuasi, Ghana. On 10 April 2010, he scored his first hat-trick in Germany for Erzgebirge Aue against VfL Osnabrück.

References

External links 
 

1980 births
Living people
People from Obuasi
Ghanaian footballers
Association football forwards
3. Liga players
Ashanti Gold SC players
FC St. Pauli players
Kickers Emden players
SC Pfullendorf players
1. FC Magdeburg players
FC Erzgebirge Aue players
SV Wacker Burghausen players
Arminia Bielefeld players
TuS Dassendorf players
Ghanaian expatriate footballers
Ghanaian expatriate sportspeople in Germany
Expatriate footballers in Germany